A Fine Romance is a 1991 comedy film directed by Gene Saks.

Plot
An Italian gentleman, Cesareo, and a doctor's wife, Pamela, meet in Paris and enjoy time with each other until they learn their spouses are cheating. To teach them a lesson, they plot to break up their spouses' tryst.

Cast
 Julie Andrews as Mrs. Pamela Piquet
 Marcello Mastroianni as Mr. Cesareo Grimaldi
 Jean-Pierre Castaldi as Marcel
 Jonathan Cecil
 Ian Fitzgibbon
 Jean-Jacques Dulon as Dr. Noiret
 Maria Machado as Miss Knudson
 Denise Grey as Madame Legris
 Jean-Michel Cannone as Dr. Picquet
 Catherine Jarret as Marguerite (as Catherine Jarrett)
 Françoise Michaud as Madeleine
 Hervé Hiolle as Hospital Doctor
 Yvette Petit as 1st Concierge
 Michèle Amiel as 2nd Concierge
 Ronald Mills as Maitre
 Michele Buczynski as Sales Person Photo Shop
 Isidro Arruti as Waiter "Hotel particular"

References

External links
 
 
 

1991 films
1991 comedy films
Italian comedy films
1990s Italian-language films
Italian films based on plays
Films directed by Gene Saks
Films scored by Pino Donaggio
1990s English-language films
1990s Italian films